Antonio Stelitano (born 22 October 1987) is an Italian footballer who plays for Sliema Wanderers in Malta.

Career
Stelitano started his senior career with A.C.R. Messina. In 2009, he signed for A.S.D. Igea Virtus Barcellona in the Italian Serie C, where he made twenty league appearances and scored one goal. After that, he played for Club Atlético Unión, A.S.D. Cittanova Interpiana Calcio, Parma Calcio 1913, Moca, SD Buelna, CS Baloteşti, CS Șoimii Pâncota, CDE Melistar, FK Nevėžis, Anduud City, and Sliema Wanderers, where he now plays.

References

External links 
 
 Stelitano, an Italian in Mongolia
 Antonio Stelitano, the Sicilian footballer globetrotter On the fields between the Dominican Republic and Mongolia
 THE STORY - TUTTOLEGAPRO, THE INTERVIEW: Antonio Stelitano from Barcelona Pg: "To play in the Pro League I ended up in...America"
 Stelitano in Romania: "Ready for this new adventure"
 EXCLUSIVE EC - Stelitano: "They call me globetrotter and I'm proud of it, on Nevezis and my future..."
 The "globetrotter" Antonio Stelitano: from Real Messina to Argentina
 @Mdc, Antonio Stelitano: "From Messina to Santo Domingo via Argentina, here's my story"

1987 births
Living people
A.C.R. Messina players
A.P.S. Zakynthos players
A.S.D. Cittanova Interpiana Calcio players
A.S.D. Giarre Calcio 1946 players
A.S.D. Igea Virtus Barcellona players
Anduud City FC players
Arsenal F.C. (Honduras) players
Association football defenders
CS Balotești players
CS Șoimii Pâncota players
Eccellenza players
Expatriate footballers in Argentina
Expatriate footballers in Greece
Expatriate footballers in Honduras
Expatriate footballers in Lithuania
Expatriate footballers in Malta
Expatriate footballers in Mongolia
Expatriate footballers in Romania
Expatriate footballers in Spain
Expatriate footballers in the Dominican Republic
FC Jumilla players
FK Nevėžis players
Honduran Liga Nacional de Ascenso players
I Lyga players
Italian expatriate footballers
Italian expatriate sportspeople in Argentina
Italian expatriate sportspeople in Greece
Italian expatriate sportspeople in Honduras
Italian expatriate sportspeople in Lithuania
Italian expatriate sportspeople in Malta
Italian expatriate sportspeople in Mongolia
Italian expatriate sportspeople in Romania
Italian expatriate sportspeople in Spain
Italian expatriate sportspeople in the Dominican Republic
Italian footballers
Liga Dominicana de Fútbol players
Liga II players
Maltese Premier League players
Moca FC players
Real Arroyo Seco footballers
SD Buelna players
Serie C players
Serie D players
Sliema Wanderers F.C. players
Sportspeople from Messina
Tercera División players